Oberon is a town located within the Oberon Council local government area, in the central tablelands region of New South Wales, Australia. The main industries are farming, forestry and wood products. The town usually receives snowfall during the winter months, owing to its high elevation. At the 2021 census, Oberon had a population of 3,319 people.

It is the birthplace of Greens politician Bob Brown, Ken Sutcliffe, supermotard rider Scott Saul, former Penrith Panthers players Ray Blacklock, Mark Booth, Dr Therese Wales and DJ Tallis O’Neill. Oberon is located near Jenolan Caves and the Kanangra-Boyd National Park.

Australian pub rock band Cold Chisel filmed the music video to their hit song "Flame Trees" in and around Oberon. The song's lyrics (written by Cold Chisel keyboardist Don Walker) present the story of a young man returning to his hometown, where he reminisces about the past and his former girlfriend from the region.

History
The town was permanently settled in 1839, originally named Bullock Flat, until it was renamed to Oberon in 1863.
Gold was discovered on the Fish River in 1823, leading to a population boost in the area.
The Oberon Council was formed in 1906.
The Fish River Creek Post Office opened on 1 January 1855 and was renamed Oberon in 1866.

Heritage listings 
Oberon has a number of heritage-listed sites, including:
 Blue Mountains National Park: Blue Mountains walking tracks
 124 Oberon Street: Malachi Gilmore Memorial Hall
 Tarana-Oberon railway: Oberon railway station
 Caves Road: Jenolan Caves

Commercial area
Oberon's main streets are Carrington Avenue–Oberon Street and Ross Street. The town has several parks and sports facilities. Such parks include the Oberon Showground, Cunynghame Oval, and Apex Park. Oberon also has a museum on North Street. Oberon has a caravan park on Cunynghame Street off North Street, a hospital on North Street, a camping ground adjacent to the caravan park and a wood gallery on Oberon Street. Rotary Lookout is located on Abercrombie Road and to the east of the town is the Blenheim State Forest which includes walking tracks.

Culture 
Fishing is a pastime possible at Lake Oberon and The Reef Reserve. Oberon also has a golf club off Hume Street.

Oberon is known for its two inns, the Big Trout Motor Inn and the Highlands Motor Inn.

South of the town is Lake Oberon, Oberon Dam and the Fish River. There is a picnic area at the dam and a reserve with walking tracks near the lake.

Rugby league football coach Craig Bellamy started his playing career with Oberon Tigers team in the 1970s.

Mayfield Garden is a popular botanical garden that covers 16 hectares (40 acres) of land. It is open daily, except on public holidays and there is an entry fee.

Jillaroo turned interior designer, fashionista and active wear entrepreneur Rachael Challinor spent her formative years in Oberon before moving to Sydney.  Known for her sometimes abrasive and outspoken views, she credits the town's Big Trout as a key source of influence on her prolific artistic and creative works in her later years.

Transport
From 1923 to 1979, Oberon was served by a branch railway line noted for its very steep 4% gradients and very sharp 100 m radius curves. Following closure, that line was allowed to fall into disrepair, but has been under restoration by the volunteer organisation Oberon Tarana Heritage Railway since 2005.

Road access
 Relief maps of the area are provided by NSW Central Ranges Weather.

Bus connection
From 1 June 2020, there is a Monday to Friday morning bus service to  station where it connects with the Bathurst Bullet train to Sydney  with an afternoon return connection. This replaced the previous three days a week coach service to

Climate
Oberon has an oceanic climate (Cfb); with mild to warm summers, cool to cold winters averaging 0° to 9 °C and evenly-spread precipitation throughout the year. Frosts occur regularly during autumn, winter and spring. Because of its elevation and windward position on the dividing range, moderate to occasionally heavy snowfalls can be expected each year.

See also

 Oberon Correctional Centre
 Mount Trickett
 Mount Bindo
 Shooters Hill

References

External links

Oberon Council website
VISITNSW.com - Oberon

Towns in New South Wales
Central Tablelands
Oberon Council